Maria Harper (born 2 February 1963) is a former England women's international footballer. Harper's greatest achievement is winning the 1989 WFA Cup Final with Leasowe Pacific.

Honours

Leasowe Pacific
 FA Women's Cup: 1988–89;  runner-up: 1987–88

Liverpool
 FA Women's Cup:  runner-up: 1994–95, 1995–96,

References

Living people
English women's footballers
England women's international footballers
Liverpool F.C. Women players
Everton F.C. (women) players
FA Women's National League players
Footballers from Liverpool
Women's association football midfielders
Women's association football forwards
1963 births